IOI City Mall is a shopping mall located in Sepang District, Selangor, Malaysia, which was developed by IOI Properties Group Berhad and opened in November 2014. It is positioned as a "mid-upper-class mall" to draw about 1.8 million people from the southern corridor of Putrajaya, Cyberjaya, Kajang, Bangi, Seri Kembangan, Serdang, Puchong, Bukit Jalil and Subang Jaya.

The second phase of the mall opened in 25 August 2022, making as the largest shopping mall in Malaysia surpassing 1 Utama, as well the largest mall in Southeast Asia and second largest mall in the world.

Features 
IOI City Mall contains  of retail space for both phases, with over 650 stores catering to people living in southern Klang Valley without having to go to capital city Kuala Lumpur. 

The Phase 1 section of the mall also features the District 21, a post-apocalypse themed recreational park; Icescape Ice Skating Rink, a large Olympic-sized ice skating rink; IOI City Farm, an edutainment exhibition space with an “indoor living planet” concept and Golden Screen Cinemas with GSC Maxx and 4DX halls.

The Phase 2 of IOI City Mall opened in August 2022, adding additional net lettable area  and over 300 new retail stores including AEON department store (currently the supermarket section opened in 12 January 2023 while the department store will be open by first quarter of 2023), Japanese retail brands like Nitori, Best Denki and Jonetz by Don Don Donki, luxury brands like Coach New York and Tory Burch, new restaurants and cafes such as Kenny Hills Bakers, Din by Din Tai Fung, Jollibee, Taco Bell and more, fitness centre Believe Fitness, multi-purpose sports hall with badminton and futsal courts known as IOI Sports Centre, IOI Grand Exhibition Hall, Proton Premium Outlet, and Golden Screen Cinemas expansion branch featuring Malaysia's first IMAX hall with Laser Projection, GSC BIG, Play+ & ONYX hall.

Access

Car 
IOI City Mall is located near the South Klang Valley Expressway (SKVE)  with over 16,600 parking bays provided. Despite the mall is branded to situate in administrative capital Putrajaya, it is actually located in Sepang district of Selangor while Putrajaya itself located 9km from the mall. From Kuala Lumpur International Airport, the mall is accessible 35km and reachable within 30 minutes.

Rail 
The nearest rail stations to serve IOI City Mall are  Serdang KTM and  UPM MRT station, however the mall is no longer providing shuttle bus since 2020 (including from the   Kajang station).

Bus 
IOI City Mall is accessible via the local bus  by KR Travel & Tours from Putrajaya Sentral,  Serdang KTM station and Lebuh Pudu bus hub in Kuala Lumpur, as well the free smart bus  by Smart Selangor MPSepang from Taman Seroja Bandar Baru Salak Tinggi and Hospital Serdang. All the bus routes stop at the terminal hub located in P3 floor of Phase 1, which is shared with the motorcycle parking.

See also 
 IOI Mall Puchong

References

External links 
 

Sepang District
Shopping malls established in 2014
Shopping malls in Selangor